Pence is the surname of:

Athletes
 Elmer Pence (1900–1968), American Major League Baseball outfielder
 Hunter Pence (born 1983), American former Major League Baseball player
 Penny Pence (born 1929), American swimmer and swim coach
 Rusty Pence (1900–1971), American baseball pitcher

Politicians and public officials
 Donna Pence (born 1942), American politician
 Greg Pence (born 1956), American businessman and politician
 Lafe Pence (1857–1923), American politician
 Martin Pence (1904–2000), American lawyer and judge
 Mike Pence (born 1959), American politician, broadcaster and lawyer, former vice president of the United States
 Otto V. Pence (1882–1936), American politician
 Steve Pence (born 1953), American politician, lieutenant governor of Kentucky
 Thomas Jones Pence (1873–1916), American politician

Other uses
 Charlotte Pence Bond (born 1993), American writer, daughter of Mike Pence
 Denise Pence (born 1949), American actress
 Ellen Pence (1948–2012), American scholar and social activist
 Gregory Pence (born 1948), American philosopher and academic
 Joanne Pence ( 1970–2006), author of romantic comedy mystery novels
 Josh Pence (born 1982), American actor
 Karen Pence (born 1957), American schoolteacher and painter, wife of Mike Pence
 Matt Pence (born 1972), American recording engineer, producer, and drummer
 Robert Pence (born 1945), American businessman
 Rosemarie Pence (born c. 1938), German-American who posed as a Holocaust child survivor